The 2018–19 Patriot League men's basketball season began with practices in October 2018, followed by the start of the 2018–19 NCAA Division I men's basketball season in November. Conference play began in January 2019 and concluded in February 2019. The season marked the 32nd season of Patriot League basketball.

Preseason

Coaching changes 
On March 8, 2018, Loyola (Maryland) announced G. G. Smith had resigned as head coach. He finished at Loyola with a five-year record of 56–98. On March 28, the Greyhounds hired Georgia Tech assistant coach Tavaras Hardy for the head coaching job.

Preseason poll 
Source

() first place votes

Preseason All-Conference Teams 
Source

Patriot League Preseason Player of the Year: Sa'eed Nelson (American)

Regular season

Conference matrix

Season summary & highlights

Points scored

Conference regular season

Midseason watchlists

Postseason

Patriot League Tournament

NCAA Tournament

Awards and honors

References